The buff-headed coucal (Centropus milo) is a species of coucal. These are often placed in the cuckoo family (Cuculidae) but seem to warrant recognition as a distinct family. C. milo is a common  endemic of the central islands of the Solomon Islands. Its natural habitat is tropical moist lowland and mountain forests, mostly in primary and secondary growth.

This species is a large cuckoo with a heavy bill and short wings. In total length, this species may measure . The plumage of adults is striking with a buff head, upper back and undersides, and glossy black wings, lower back and tail. The iris is red and legs and bill are dark grey. Juveniles are very differently colored, with the wings and tail reddish brown with black barring somewhat like in the allopatric pheasant coucal, and the rest of the plumage brown mottled with black. The iris is brown-grey and the bill is bicolored, brown above and pale horn below.

In local languages, the adult and juvenile are treated as different kinds of bird and each has a name of its own. For example, in Touo, Roviana and Marovo, the adult is called mozu, nao and ao, respectively, while the names for the juveniles are sagaza, sengenge and chehohu.

Footnotes

References
 Doughty, Chris; Day, Nicolas & Plant, Andrew (1999): Birds of the Solomons, Vanuatu and New Caledonia. Christopher Helm, London. 
 Read, John L. & Moseby, Katherine (2006): Vertebrates of Tetepare Island, Solomon Islands. Pacific Science 60(1): 69–79. DOI: 10.2984/1534-6188(2006)60[69:VOTISI]2.0.CO;2 HTML abstract

buff-headed coucal
Birds of the Western Province (Solomon Islands)
Birds of Guadalcanal
buff-headed coucal
Taxonomy articles created by Polbot